The Head of the River rowing regatta in Western Australia is an annual rowing event held at the Champion Lakes Regatta Centre in Champion Lakes. There are two separate events. The boys regatta held in autumn, and the girls regatta held in winter.

Boys Regatta

The Head of the River regatta is the last rowing event of the Public Schools Association (PSA) calendar. The boys regatta held in early autumn is contested between the seven PSA boys schools: Aquinas College, Christ Church Grammar School, Guildford Grammar School, Hale School, Scotch College, Trinity College, and Wesley College.

The boys regatta for Head of the River was first held in 1899 between CBC Perth, The Church of England Grammar School (renamed Guildford Grammar School in 1906), The Alexander Scotch College (name shortened to Scotch College in 1908), and The High School (renamed Hale School in 1929).

Originally, the race for Head of the River was held between coxed fours from each school and the winning crew was awarded the Challenge Cup. When the PSA formed in 1905 rowing was one of the five inaugural sports of the competition and the Challenge Cup was awarded as a PSA trophy. In 1938 the Challenge Cup changed to the current race format between the first coxed eights from each school. Over the years the number of rowing events increased. In 1982 the Hamer Cup was introduced and awarded annually to the school which scored the most points for placings in each event at the regatta.

The course has changed many times. The regatta was originally held on the swan river. When Perth won the 1962 British Empire and Commonwealth Games, the regatta moved to the 6 lane Canning River course. In 1969 the event returned to the wider course on the Swan River at the base of Kings Park near the Narrows Bridge. Since 2009 the event has been held at the purpose built rowing course at Champion Lakes, Kelmscott. Records have tumbled since the venue change with records set in 2009 and 2010. The current record time for the 2000m event is 5 minutes 48.2 seconds, set by Trinity College.

Challenge Cup

1st IV winners 1899-1937 & 1st VIII winners 1938–present

NB: † Denotes no race

Challenge Cup tally

Aquinas includes 16 wins by CBC Perth during 1899-1937.
Guildford includes one win by The Church of England Grammar School during 1899-1905.
Hale includes seven wins by The High School during 1899-1928.
Scotch includes five wins by The Alexander Scotch College during 1899-1907.

Hamer Cup

Overall points

NB: † Denotes no racing

Hamer Cup tally

Girls regatta

In the winter season several private Perth girls schools in the Independent Girls Schools Sports Association (IGSSA) race for the title.

1st VIII winners

Overall points score

See also 
 Head of the River (Australia)
 Public Schools Association
 Independent Girls Schools Sports Association (Perth)

References

External links 
 Rowing Australia

Rowing competitions in Australia
Sports competitions in Western Australia
Public Schools Association (Western Australia)
Recurring sporting events established in 1899
Rowing in Western Australia
Scholastic rowing in Australia
1899 establishments in Australia